Thomas or Tom Richardson may refer to:

Politics
Thomas Richardson, 2nd Lord Cramond (1627–1674), English politician
Thomas Richardson (Hartlepool MP, born 1821) (1821–1890), English manufacturer of marine engines and Liberal (later Liberal Unionist) MP for Hartlepool 1874–1875 and 1880–1890
Thomas Richardson (Hartlepool MP, born 1846) (1846–1906), English Liberal Unionist politician, MP for Hartlepool 1895–1900
Thomas Richardson (Labour politician) (1876–1945), British Labour Party politician, MP 1910–1918

Sports
Thomas Richardson (cricketer) (1865–1923), English cricketer
Tom Richardson (cricketer) (1870–1912), English cricketer
Tom Richardson (pinch hitter) (1883–1939), American Major League Baseball player
T. D. Richardson (Thomas Dow Richardson, 1887–1971), British figure skater
Tom Richardson (footballer) (1891–?), English footballer
Tom Richardson (pitcher) (1905-?), Negro league baseball player
Tom Richardson (American football) (born 1944), American football wide receiver
Thomas Richardson (wrestler) (born 1956), professional wrestler known by his stage name of Tommy "Wildfire" Rich

Others
Thomas Richardson (judge) (1569–1635), Lord Chief Justice of England and Wales
Thomas Richardson (chemist) (1816–1867), English industrial chemist and historian
Vic Richardson (Australian soldier) (Thomas William Victor Richardson, 1891–1968), World War I Australian soldier and diarist
Thomas Richardson (cartographer), 18th century Scottish cartographer
Thomas Richardson (businessman) (1771–1853), investor and director of the Stockton and Darlington Railway and founder of Middlesbrough
Thomas Miles Richardson (1784–1848), English landscape-painter

See also 
Thomas Richards (disambiguation)